Langenorla is a municipality in the district Saale-Orla-Kreis, in Thuringia, Germany.

References

Municipalities in Thuringia
Saale-Orla-Kreis